Villa Massa  (30% alc/vol) is a brand of limoncello (sweet lemon liqueur) produced in the Sorrento peninsula of the region of Campania, Italy.

History
The production company for Villa Massa was founded in 1991 by brothers Stefano and Sergio Massa, from Sorrento. The recipe for the liqueur Villa Massa has its origins in a family recipe from 1890, made with fresh lemons from the Massa family grove. The Villa Massa estate, one of the agricultural and residential properties of the Massa family, is found in the Piano di Sorrento, in the center of the Sorrentine peninsula near the city of Naples.

In 2000, the oval lemons of Sorrento (in Italian, limone di Sorrento), used in the production of Villa Massa Limoncello, were registered as a Protected Geographical Indication (P.G.I.) by the European Union. In 2006, the liqueur made from these lemons was registered as "Liquore di Limone di Sorrento".

Since 2006, the company is part of the family owned Grupo Zamora S.L.U.

Production 
The lemons are hand-picked, and within 24 hours of harvesting are peeled to obtain a very fine layer of zest, reducing the extraction of white pith as much as possible to prevent the liqueur from having an excessively bitter after-taste.

The zest is then macerated in alcohol, to allow the oils of the skin to impregnate the flavors and aromas characteristic of this limoncello. After a few days, the infusion is strained and filtered several times at a constant temperature, mixed with purified water and sugar, then bottled.

Cocktails 
It is traditionally drunk ice cold as an aperitivo or digestivo if mixed with other ingredients like sparkling water or prosecco and herbs like basil.

Villa Massa Tonica 
Villa Massa Tonica is made of Villa Massa limoncello, tonic water and basil. It can be served as a fresh drink or aperitivo.

References

External links
 Grupo Zamora S.L.U

Citrus liqueurs
Lemon drinks
Italian liqueurs
Sorrento